Phantomsmasher is an experimental grindcore/electronic band led by musician James Plotkin, previously known as Atomsmasher.

The band signed to Ipecac Recordings in 2002, and is reportedly currently working on a third album.

Members
James Plotkin – guitar, bass guitar, electronics
DJ Speedranch – vocals
Dave Witte – drums

Discography

Albums
Atomsmasher (as Atomsmasher, 2000), Hydra Head Records
Phantomsmasher (2002), Ipecac Recordings

Splits
Podsjfkj Pojid Poa / Oisdjoks 7" (with Venetian Snares, 2003), Hydra Head Records

Videos
"Thunderspit" (from Atomsmasher)

External links
Official website

References

American musical trios
American noise rock music groups
Noisecore musical groups
American grindcore musical groups
Ipecac Recordings artists